Finlayson is a surname of Scottish origin.  It is a patronymic form of the name Finlay.

People surnamed Finlayson include:

 Alan Finlayson, British political and social theorist
 Alex Finlayson (born 1951), American playwright
 Alex Finlayson (actor) (1917–2000), American film actor in D-Day the Sixth of June (1956), Journey to the Center of the Earth (1959), etc.
 Cathryn Finlayson (born 1988), New Zealand Olympic field hockey player
 Charles Finlayson (New Zealand athlete) (1889–1943), New Zealand cricketer and rugby league player
 Chris Finlayson (born 1956), Former New Zealand Attorney-General and MP
 Colin Finlayson (1903–1955), Canadian Olympic rower
 David Finlayson (1954), American classical musician and member of the New York Philharmonic
 George Finlayson (1790–1823), Scottish naturalist and traveller
 Gordon Finlayson, British philosopher 
 Graham Finlayson (1932–1999), British photographer
 Hedley Herbert Finlayson (1895–1991), Australian mammalogist
 Hugh Finlayson (1810–1889), Ontario businessman and politician
 Iain Finlayson (1951–1990), British Olympic Alpine skier
 Innes Finlayson (1889–1980), New Zealand Rugby union player
 James Finlayson (industrialist) (1771–1852), Scottish industrialist
 James Finlayson (actor) (1887–1953), Scottish-American actor
 John Harvey Finlayson (1843–1915), South Australian newspaper editor
 Roderick David Finlayson (1904–1992), New Zealand architectural draughtsman and writer
 Rob Finlayson, Manitoba judge
 William Finlayson (Australian politician) (1867–1955), Australian politician
 William Finlayson (Canadian politician) (1875–?), cabinet minister in Ontario 
 William Finlayson (churchman) (1813–1897), South Australian pioneer

See also

 Finlayson (disambiguation)
 Finlay (disambiguation)
 MacKinley
 McKinley (surname)

References